Lemonia sardanapalus is a moth in the family Brahmaeidae (older classifications placed it in Lemoniidae). It was described by Otto Staudinger in 1887. It is known from Turkmenistan.

References

Brahmaeidae
Moths described in 1887